Rubén García Arnal (born 14 July 1980 in Zaragoza, Aragon) is a Spanish retired footballer who played as a defensive midfielder.

Honours
Lleida
Segunda División B: 2003–04

External links
 
 

1980 births
Living people
Footballers from Zaragoza
Spanish footballers
Association football midfielders
Segunda División players
Segunda División B players
Tercera División players
Real Zaragoza B players
UE Lleida players
Racing de Ferrol footballers
Lorca Deportiva CF footballers
CE L'Hospitalet players